The qualifying competition for UEFA Euro 1992 was a series of parallel association football competitions to be held over 1990 and 1991 to decide the qualifiers for UEFA Euro 1992, to be held in Sweden. The draw for the qualifying rounds was held on 2 February 1990.

There were a total of seven groups. At the conclusion of qualifying, the team at the top of each group qualified for the final tournament, to join the hosts in completing the eight participants. This was the last European Championship to feature eight teams, as the competition was expanded to 16 teams for 1996.

Qualified teams

{| class="wikitable sortable"
|-
! Team
! Qualified as
! Qualified on
! data-sort-type="number"|Previous appearances in tournament
|-
|  ||  ||  || 0 (debut)
|-
|  || Group 1 winner ||  || 2 (1960, 1984)
|-
|  || Group 7 winner ||  || 3 (1968, 1980, 1988)
|-
|  || Group 3 winner ||  || 5 (1960, 1964, 1968, 1972, 1988)
|-
|  || Group 2 winner ||  || 0 (debut)
|-
|  || Group 5 winner ||  || 5 (1972, 1976, 1980, 1984, 1988)
|-
|  || Group 6 winner ||  || 3 (1976, 1980, 1988)
|-
|  || Group 4 runner-up ||  || 3 (1964, 1984, 1988)
|}

Seedings
The draw took place on 2 February 1990. Sweden qualified automatically as hosts of the competition, and 34 teams entered the draw, with the Faroe Islands and San Marino participating in a European qualifying tournament for the first time.

Following German reunification on 3 October 1990, East Germany were withdrawn since the country ceased to exist: the newly unified German team took over the fixtures of West Germany, while those of East Germany were scratched.

The qualifiers thus consisted of 33 teams divided into seven groups (two of four teams and five of five teams) were played in 1990 and 1991. Each group winner progressed to the finals. This was the last European Championship qualifying phase which awarded two points for a win; from 1996 onward, teams earned 3 points for a win.

Summary

Tiebreakers
If two or more teams finished level on points after completion of the group matches, the following tie-breakers were used to determine the final ranking:
 Greater number of points in all group matches
 Goal difference in all group matches
 Greater number of goals scored in all group matches
 Drawing of lots

Groups

Group 1

Group 2

Group 3

Group 4

Group 5

East Germany were originally drawn into this group alongside West Germany, but after reunification, a single German team participated in the qualification process, taking over the fixtures of West Germany.

Subsequently, East Germany's game on 12 September 1990 against Belgium was reclassified as a friendly, and was also East Germany's final international match, which it won 2–0: the remaining seven fixtures of East Germany were scratched.

Group 6

Group 7

Goalscorers

Notes

References

External links
 UEFA Euro 1992 at UEFA.com

 
Qualifying

1992
UEFA Euro 1992